Western station or Western Avenue Station may refer to:

Chicago, Illinois
Western station (CTA Blue Line Congress branch), an el station
Western station (CTA Blue Line O'Hare branch), an el station
Western station (CTA Brown Line), an el station
Western station (CTA Orange Line), an el station
Western station (CTA Pink Line), an el station
Western Avenue station (Milwaukee District), a commuter rail station
Western Avenue station (BNSF Railway), a commuter rail station

Los Angeles, California
Hollywood/Western (LACMTA station), a subway station on the B Line
Wilshire/Western (LACMTA station), a subway station on the D Line
Western/Expo (LACMTA station), a light-rail station on the E Line

Elsewhere
Western Avenue station (Metro Transit), a proposed light rail station in Saint Paul, Minnesota
Western Springs station, a commuter rail station in Western Springs, Illinois

See also
Western (disambiguation)
Western Avenue (disambiguation)